Mingo Junction is a village in eastern Jefferson County, Ohio, United States, along the Ohio River. The population was 3,347 at the 2020 census. It is part of the Weirton–Steubenville metropolitan area.

History

The Mingo Indian tribe once had a settlement at the location of the present day village, which is the source of its name. Originally known as Mingo Bottom or Mingo Town, it was the starting point for the ill-fated Crawford expedition against Native Americans in 1782, during the American Revolutionary War.

In 1770, George Washington set out on an expedition to explore the Ohio River Valley. On the 22nd day of October he camped overnight in what was known then as Mingo Town, describing it as blustery and cold with about 20 cabins and 70 inhabitants of the Iroquois Confederation. Washington wrote a complete account of his observations in a diary stored in the Library of Congress.

Mingo Junction was founded circa 1869 when an iron works was started there. In 1900, its only manufacturing plant was a steel mill owned by Carnegie Steel Company.

Geography
Mingo Junction is located at  (40.319869, -80.612240). It is in the Eastern time zone, and the average elevation is 797 ft.

Neighborhoods
Altamont,
Churchill, 
Hillsboro,
Hunky Hill,
North Hill, 
Sunrise Terrace,
Downtown (Commercial Ave.), and
Goulds

Demographics

2010 census
As of the census of 2010, there were 3,454 people, 1,488 households, and 948 families living in the village. The racial makeup of the village was 94.5% White, 3.6% African American, 0.3% Native American, 0.1% Asian, 0.1% from other races, and 1.4% from two or more races. Hispanic or Latino of any race were 0.8% of the population.

There were 1,488 households, of which 26.7% had children under the age of 18 living with them, 44.0% were married couples living together, 14.3% had a female householder with no husband present, 5.4% had a male householder with no wife present, and 36.3% were non-families. 31.6% of all households were made up of individuals, and 16.1% had someone living alone who was 65 years of age or older. The average household size was 2.32 and the average family size was 2.89.

The median age in the village was 44.2 years. 21.1% of residents were under the age of 18; 8.6% were between the ages of 18 and 24; 21.4% were from 25 to 44; 29% were from 45 to 64; and 19.9% were 65 years of age or older. The gender makeup of the village was 47.5% male and 52.5% female.

2000 census
As of the census of 2000, there were 3,631 people, 1,542 households, and 1,062 families living in the village. The population density was 1,430.7 people per square mile (551.9/km2). There were 1,691 housing units at an average density of 666.3 per square mile (257.0/km2). The racial makeup of the village was 95.35% White, 3.00% African American, 0.17% Native American, 0.03% Asian, 0.11% Pacific Islander, 0.39% from other races, and 0.96% from two or more races. Hispanic or Latino of any race were 0.77% of the population.

There were 1,542 households, out of which 25.6% had children under the age of 18 living with them, 51.8% were married couples living together, 12.9% had a female householder with no husband present, and 31.1% were non-families. 27.6% of all households were made up of individuals, and 15.0% had someone living alone who was 65 years of age or older. The average household size was 2.35 and the average family size was 2.84.

In the village, the population was spread out, with 21.1% under the age of 18, 6.5% from 18 to 24, 25.6% from 25 to 44, 26.8% from 45 to 64, and 20.0% who were 65 years of age or older. The median age was 43 years. For every 100 females, there were 87.7 males. For every 100 females age 18 and over, there were 84.8 males.

The median income for a household in the village was $30,196, and the median income for a family was $40,326. Males had a median income of $37,969 versus $20,809 for females. The per capita income for the village was $16,062. About 10.8% of families and 12.8% of the population were below the poverty line, including 19.0% of those under age 18 and 8.1% of those age 65 or over.

Education

Public education in the village of Mingo Junction is provided by the Indian Creek Local School District. Campuses serving the village include Hills Elementary School (Preschool-Grade 4), Indian Creek Middle School (Grades 5-8), and Indian Creek High School  (Grades 9-12). Jefferson County Christian School was also located in the area until 2012. Until 2009, the Catholic school of St. Agnes (Pre-kindergarten to eighth grade) was part of the Steubenville Parochial School District.

Notable people
 Bill Batsch, major league baseball player
 Andrea DeShong, professional boxer
 Joe Fortunato, professional football player for Chicago Bears
 Woody Hayes, iconic Ohio State University football coach; coached in Mingo Junction
 George Kakasic, pro football player of 1930s
 Robert Parissi, lead singer of Wild Cherry
 Harry “Light Horse” Wilson, College Football Hall of Fame (1973) and National Lacrosse Hall of Fame (1963), WWII bomber pilot

Usage in film
Mingo Junction served as the Pennsylvania steel mill town in the 1978 film The Deer Hunter, which won the Academy Award for Best Picture and starred Robert De Niro, Meryl Streep, Christopher Walken, and John Cazale.  Many of the scenes that took place in and around a steel mill were filmed in Mingo Junction.  The 1979 film Take Down, starring Lorenzo Lamas and Kevin Hooks, was set at Mingo Junction High School.  Mingo was also the primary filming location for Reckless, released in 1984 and starring Aidan Quinn and Daryl Hannah.  Many scenes were set in Mingo Junction or nearby cities such as Steubenville, Ohio, and Weirton, West Virginia and Pittsburgh.  Mingo Junction's movie credentials also include the 1983 TV movie Heart of Steel, with Peter Strauss and Pamela Reed.

In 2016, the village was visited and filmed for a Dutch television show called "Jensen kiest voor Amerika" (Jensen chooses for America).

See also
 List of cities and towns along the Ohio River

References

External links
 Historic photographs of Mingo Junction
 Feature on the Mingo Junction steel mill demolition of 2014

Villages in Jefferson County, Ohio
Villages in Ohio
Ohio populated places on the Ohio River